Ada Henry Van Pelt (1838 – August 7, 1923) was a temperance and suffrage activist, editor, lecturer, and, later in life, an inventor. She held several patents, including one for an electric water purifier, patented when she was 74 years old.

Early life
Ada Henry was born in 1838, in Princeton, Kentucky, daughter of Major C. B. Henry, a banker. She had a sister Anna and a brother, Col. A. P. Henry, who commanded the 15th Kentucky Cavalry during the Civil War.

Career
Mrs. Van Pelt was editor and main writer of the temperance weekly Pacific Ensign for six years, ending in 1897. During her time at the weekly, she served a term as president of the Pacific Coast Women's Press Association. She went on a lecture tour in 1898, speaking about California and her work with the American Red Cross during the Spanish–American War, with illustrations.

Mrs. Van Pelt also wrote two plays which were produced in the San Francisco area, "The Cross Roads School," a "roaring burlesque," and "The Quaker Sentinel," a Civil War drama.

Van Pelt held several patents, including for an improved permutation lock, and another for "An Apparatus for Utilizing Momentum" in 1911. She became an honorary member of the French Academy of Sciences in 1912.

Personal life
Ada Henry married Captain Charles E. Van Pelt in 1864, while he was serving in the 48th Regiment Kentucky Volunteer Mounted Infantry. The couple moved to Nebraska after the Civil War. Mrs. Van Pelt moved to California in 1889. Ada Henry Van Pelt was one of the founders of the public library in Lincoln, Nebraska. She was a member of the Ebell Club in Los Angeles.

Ada Henry Van Pelt died in 1923, age 84.

References

1838 births
1923 deaths
American women journalists
American inventors
Journalists from Kentucky
People from Princeton, Kentucky
Women inventors
Kentucky women writers
Activists from Kentucky
Pacific Coast Women's Press Association